Emilio Giovanoli (1886 - date of death unknown) was an Italian long-distance runner that competed in the men's 3 miles team race at the 1908 Summer Olympics.

References

External links 
 

1886 births
Date of death unknown
Athletes (track and field) at the 1908 Summer Olympics
Italian male long-distance runners
Olympic athletes of Italy
Place of birth missing